The 1978 Minnesota Golden Gophers football team represented the University of Minnesota in the 1978 Big Ten Conference football season. In their seventh and final year under head coach Cal Stoll, the Golden Gophers compiled a 7–5 record but were outscored by their opponents by a combined total of 267 to 210. 
 
Tailback Marion Barber Jr. received the team's Most Valuable Player award. Barber Jr., kicker Paul Rogind, defensive back Keith Brown and defensive end  Stan Sytsma were named All-Big Ten first team. Nose guard Doug Friberg and defensive tackle Jim Ronan were named All-Big Ten second team. Sytsma was named Academic All-Big Ten.

Total attendance for the season was 238,072, which averaged to 39,678. The season high for attendance was against Ohio State.

Schedule

References

Minnesota
Minnesota Golden Gophers football seasons
Minnesota Golden Gophers football